Newmillerdam is a village and suburb of Wakefield, in West Yorkshire, England. The name refers to the lake and country park adjacent to the village. The park is a local nature reserve.

Formerly known as Thurstonhaigh, the village is currently named from the construction of a grain mill powered by water from the dammed lake, and thus it is called the new mill on the dam. The mill still stands, although it is non-operational and privately owned. The mill was originally owned and operated by the Pashley family, who lived in the village until the 1980s. The Pashleys owned many local businesses during the centuries, which included blacksmiths, coal mines and a furniture making business. These furniture makers were also general carpenters and installed one of the first public toilets in the yard of The Three Houses Public House in 1852.

The Pashley family were Methodists and were provided money to build two chapels in the village. The chapels are situated on School Hill and Barnsley Road. The Pashley reference is noted by the dedication stones to William M Pashley. The family also funded and built Newmillerdam School, which is located on School Hill. However, the landowning gentry of the time, the Pilkington family, took most of the credit and introduced the Miss Pilkington Scripture Prize as an annual award in the school. One of the last pupils to receive this prize before the school was closed and sold by the local council was a Pashley family member, Sharon Mulheir (now Smith). She is the great-great-great-great-granddaughter of the school's founder, William Pashley.

Chevet Hall was a mansion that stood on the site of an older hall to the east of Newmillerdam and was built in 1529 by the Neviles. The hall was demolished as a result of mining subsidence in the 1960s, despite a massive outcry from locals. In 1765, the hall and estate was acquired by the Pilkingtons; in 1820, they built the boathouse on the lake on their private grounds. The Pilkingtons built lodges around their  private estate to deter poachers; some of them survived. It was opened to the public after Wakefield Council bought the estate in 1954. The boathouse is a Grade II listed building.

There was a Newmillerdam Colliery, close to the small village of Hall Green; it closed in 1981. As with many Wakefield collieries, the closure was agreed with the NUM on the basis that the workers could transfer to the new Selby Coalfield.

Seckar Woods nature reserve, located near the more affluent village of Woolley, is an SSSI (Site of Special Scientific Interest).

References

External links

Suburbs of Wakefield
Local Nature Reserves in West Yorkshire